Rachel Crotto (born December 25, 1958) is an American chess player who holds the title of Woman International Master (WIM, 1978). She is a two-time winner of the U.S. Women's Chess Championship (1978, 1979).

Biography
From the 1970s to the 1980s, Crotto was one of the leading female chess players in the United States. She played in her first United States Women's Championship at the age of 12. She two times won the United States Women's Chess Championships in 1978 (with Diane Savereide) and 1979. In 1978, Crotto was awarded the FIDE Woman International Master (WIM) title.

Crotto played for United States in the Women's Chess Olympiads:
 In 1976, at second board in the 7th Chess Olympiad (women) in Haifa (+5, =2, -2),
 In 1980, at second board in the 9th Chess Olympiad (women) in Valletta (+4, =3, -4),
 In 1982, at first reserve board in the 10th Chess Olympiad (women) in Lucerne (+4, =2, -3),
 In 1984, at first reserve board in the 26th Chess Olympiad (women) in Thessaloniki (+8, =2, -1) and won individual silver medal,
 In 1986, at first board in the 27th Chess Olympiad (women) in Dubai (+1, =1, -5).

Crotto participated twice in the Women's World Chess Championship Interzonal Tournaments:
 In 1979, at Interzonal Tournament in Rio de Janeiro shared 12th-13th place;
 In 1982, at Interzonal Tournament in Bad Kissingen shared 15th-16th place.

Since 1986, she has rarely participated in chess tournaments.

References

External links
 
 
 
 

1958 births
Living people
Chess Woman International Masters
American female chess players
Chess Olympiad competitors
21st-century American women